The James Mitchell House is a historic home located at Indiana, Indiana County, Pennsylvania.  The front section was built about 1850, and is a -story brick building with a gable roof in a vernacular Federal-style. It measures six bays by four bays. It has a -story frame rear wing, making for an "L"-shaped building.  The house was used as an inn.

It was added to the National Register of Historic Places in 1978.

References

Indiana, Pennsylvania
Houses on the National Register of Historic Places in Pennsylvania
Federal architecture in Pennsylvania
Houses completed in 1850
Houses in Indiana County, Pennsylvania
National Register of Historic Places in Indiana County, Pennsylvania
Individually listed contributing properties to historic districts on the National Register in Pennsylvania